Panthea gigantea is a moth of the family Noctuidae. It is found throughout much of the warmer and drier regions of western North America from south-central British Columbia, south to the state of Durango in Mexico and from the Black Hills of South Dakota, western Nebraska and the Texas Panhandle west to Washington, Oregon and the coast of California.

Panthea gigantea is on average the largest New World species of Panthea with some females having a wingspan in excess of 60 mm.

External links
Bug Guide
Revision of the New World Panthea Hübner (Lepidoptera, Noctuidae) with descriptions of 5 new species and 2 new subspecies

Pantheinae
Moths of North America
Moths described in 1890